Bob & Sheri may refer to:

Bob & Sheri (band), a 1960s pop duo consisting of Bob Norberg and Sheryl Pomeroy
The Bob and Sheri Show, an American syndicated radio show

See also
 Bob (personal name)
 Sheri (disambiguation)